The Aerojet SD-2 Overseer was an unmanned aerial vehicle developed by Aerojet General and Rheem Manufacturing Co. in the late 1950s for use by the United States Army. Built in limited numbers, it never saw operational service.

Design and development
Development of the SD-2 drone began in 1957 by the Rheem Manufacturing Company and the project continued through the company's acquisition by Aerojet General in 1959. Developed as part of the AN/USD-2 surveillance system, the SD-2 was designed for truck launch using two solid rocket boosters; following launch, a piston engine provided propulsion. At the end of its mission, the drone would be recovered via parachute. Control was provided from a translateration system for navigation (similar to the much later differential GPS technology), which allowed the aircraft to steer on a pre-programmed course.

The SD-2 was designed to use a modular sensor system, allowing equipment to be switched between missions according to requirements. Available payloads included cameras for either recovered or real-time photography, an AN/AAD-2 infrared sensor, AN/DPD-2 side looking airborne radar, or equipment for the dispensing of biological or chemical warfare agents from tanks mounted under the wings of the aircraft.

Operational history
Thirty-five production SD-2s were produced.  Poor results from the navigation system resulted in the system's cancellation in 1966, and the program was terminated without any Overseers having seen operational service. In 1963, the SD-2 was given the designation MQM-58A under the revised designation system.

Specifications

See also

References
Citations

Bibliography

 

 

SD-002
1950s United States military reconnaissance aircraft
Unmanned military aircraft of the United States
Single-engined tractor aircraft
High-wing aircraft
V-tail aircraft
Aircraft first flown in 1959